Peter Sven Broberg (born March 2, 1950) is an American former Major League Baseball pitcher.

Career
He played for the Washington Senators/Texas Rangers, Milwaukee Brewers, Chicago Cubs, and Oakland Athletics. He was drafted from Dartmouth College in 1971, and went straight to the Major Leagues. He was the fifth player to go straight to the Major Leagues after being drafted without spending a day in the minors. He was traded from the Rangers to the Brewers for Clyde Wright at the Winter Meetings on December 5, 1974. Broberg was acquired by the expansion Seattle Mariners prior to the 1977 season and traded to the Chicago Cubs for a player to be named later (Jim Todd).

Personal life
Pete Broberg's father was Gus Broberg, a three-time All-American basketball standout for Dartmouth College from 1938 to 1941. Pete is a 1972 graduate of Dartmouth.

References

External links

Baseball Gauge
Pura Pelota : VPBL pitching statistics
Retrosheet

1950 births
Águilas del Zulia players
Baseball players from Florida
Chicago Cubs players
Dartmouth Big Green baseball players
Dartmouth College alumni
Florida lawyers
Leones del Caracas players
American expatriate baseball players in Venezuela
Living people
Major League Baseball pitchers
Milwaukee Brewers players
Oakland Athletics players
Spokane Indians players
Sportspeople from West Palm Beach, Florida
Texas Rangers players
Tigres de Aragua players
Washington Senators (1961–1971) players
West Palm Beach Tropics players
Wichita Aeros players
Alaska Goldpanners of Fairbanks players